Sarrati River is a river that flows in Madhya Pradesh state of India. It is a tributary of the Wainganga River. The Wainganga itself is a tributary of the Godavari River. Lalbarra is situated on the banks of the Sarrati.

References 

Rivers of Madhya Pradesh
Tributaries of the Godavari River